is the 27th single by Gothic Music duo Ali Project. This single was released on July 14, 2010 under Mellow Head and the single only come in a regular CD only edition. The single's catalog number is LHCM-1078. The single title is used as the opening theme for the PlayStation Portable game, Fate/Extra.

Track listing

References

2010 singles
Japanese songs
Video game theme songs
Fate/stay night
Ali Project songs
2010 songs
Song articles with missing songwriters